Calsequestrin is a calcium-binding protein that acts as a calcium buffer within the sarcoplasmic reticulum.  The protein helps hold calcium in the cisterna of the sarcoplasmic reticulum after a muscle contraction, even though the concentration of calcium in the sarcoplasmic reticulum is much higher than in the cytosol. It also helps the sarcoplasmic reticulum store an extraordinarily high amount of calcium ions.  Each molecule of calsequestrin can bind 18 to 50 Ca2+ ions. Sequence analysis has suggested that calcium is not bound in distinct pockets via EF-hand motifs, but rather via presentation of a charged protein surface. Two forms of calsequestrin have been identified. The cardiac form Calsequestrin-2 (CASQ2) is present in cardiac and slow skeletal muscle and the fast skeletal form Calsequestrin-1(CASQ1) is found in fast skeletal muscle. The release of calsequestrin-bound calcium (through a calcium release channel) triggers muscle contraction. The active protein is not highly structured, more than 50% of it adopting a random coil conformation. When calcium binds there is a structural change whereby the alpha-helical content of the protein increases from 3 to 11%. Both forms of calsequestrin are phosphorylated by casein kinase 2, but the cardiac form is phosphorylated more rapidly and to a higher degree. Calsequestrin is also secreted in the gut where it deprives bacteria of calcium ions..

Cardiac calsequestrin 
Cardiac calsequestrin (CASQ2) plays an integral role in cardiac regulation. Mutations in the cardiac calsequestrin gene have been associated with cardiac arrhythmia and sudden death.  CASQ2 is thought to have a role in regulating cardiac excitation-contraction coupling and calcium-induced calcium release (CICR) in the heart, as overexpression of CASQ2 has been shown to substantially raise the magnitude of cell-averaged ICA-induced  calcium transients and spontaneous calcium sparks in isolated heart cells. Furthermore, CASQ2 modulates the CICR mechanism by lengthening to process to functionally recharge the sarcoplasmic reticulum's calcium ion stores. A lack of or mutation in CSQ2 has been directly associated with catecholaminergic polymorphic ventricular tachycardia (CPVT). A mutation can have a significant effect if it disrupts the linear polymerization ability of CASQ2, which directly accounts for its high-capacity to bind Ca2+. In addition, the hydrophobic core of domain II appears to be necessary for CASQ2's function, because a single amino acid mutation that disrupts this hydrophobic core directly leads to molecular aggregates, which are unable to respond to calcium ions.

See also
 Catecholaminergic polymorphic ventricular tachycardia

References

Further reading

External links
  GeneReviews/NCBI/NIH/UW entry on Catecholaminergic Polymorphic Ventricular Tachycardia
 

Protein families
Endoplasmic reticulum resident proteins